This list contains known album titles from both Japanese and American releases of anime music from all iterations of the Dragon Ball franchise.

The Dragon Ball Z Hit Song Collection series and the Dragon Ball Z Game Music series have each their own lists of albums with sections, due to length, each individual publication is thus not included in this article.

TV series soundtracks

Dragon Ball: Music Collection (1986)

 is the official soundtrack of the Dragon Ball released by Columbia Records of Japan April 21, 1986 on vinyl and cassette. To date this is the only known soundtrack to be released during the series' lifespan. The album would be reissued through Columbia's ANIMEX 1200 Series September 25, 2003 as its 15th release.

Track listing:
摩訶不思議アドベンチャー!Makafushigi Adobenchā!/Mystical Adventure!
旅立ちTabidachi/Setting Out
摩訶不思議アドベンチャー!Makafushigi Adobenchā!/Mystical Adventure!
セクシーギャル ブルマSekushī Gyaru Buruma/Sexy Girl Bulma
ドラゴンボールの謎Doragon Bōru no Nazo/Mystery of the Dragon Balls
ファンキー亀仙人Fankī Kame-Sen'nin/Funky Kame-Sen'nin
大荒野Dai-Kôya/Great Wilderness
妖怪出没Yôkai Shutsubotsu/Phantom Apparition
野心Yashin/Ambition
危険がいっぱいKiken ga Ippai/Danger is Everywhere
神龍出現Shenron Shutsugen/Shenlong Appears
ピラフとその部下Pirafu to Sono Buka/Pilaf and His Henchmen
野生の少年Yasei no Shônen/Boy of The Wild
ロマンティックあげるよRomantikku Ageru Yo/I'll Give You A Romantic Night

Dragon Ball: Hit Song Collection (1986)

Dragon Ball: Hit Song Collection was released in 1986.

Dragon Ball: Nan Demo Hyakka (1986)

Dragon Ball: Nan Demo Hyakka was released in 1986.

Dragon Ball: Complete Song Collection (1987)

 is the ninth album Dragon Ball and the eighth one to contain only songs from the series. Unlike the previous seven releases, it is the first one to contain all of the songs. The album was released on December 21, 1987 on CD by Columbia Records of Japan. It was later re-released on December 1, 1988 on cassette by near the end of the series' lifespan. It would be reissued again on CD on October 21, 1991 and on March 21, 1998.

Track listing:
魔訶不思議アドベンチャー!Makafushigi Adobenchā!/Mystical Adventure!
ロマンティックあげるよRomantikku Ageru yo/I'll Give You A Romantic Night
めざせ天下一Mezase Tenkaichi/Aim to Be the Greatest On Earth
ドラゴンボール伝説Doragon Bōru Densetsu/Dragon Ball Legend
Mr.ドリームを探せMr. Dorīmu o Sagase/Hunt for Mr. Dream
青き旅人たちAoki Tabibito-tachi/The Young Travelers
不思議ワンダーランドFushigi Wandārando/Mystery Wonderland
武天老師の教えMuten Rôshi no Oshie/Teachings of Muten Roshi
孫悟空ソングSon Gokū Songu/Son Goku Song
ウルフ・ハリケーンUrufu Harikēn/Wolf Hurricane
風を感じてKaze o Kanjite/Feel the Wind
夢をおしえてYume o Oshiete/Tell Me Your Dreams
レッドリボンアーミーReddo Ribon Āmī/Red Ribbon Army
初恋は雲にのってHatsukoi wa Kumo ni Notte/Riding on a Cloud is My First Love
燃えるハードで~レッドリボン軍をやっつけろMoeru Hāto de~Reddo Ribon Gun o Yattsukero/With a Burning Heart: Defeat the Red Ribbon Army
悟空のGOKIGENジャーニーGokū no GOKIGEN Jānī/Happy Journey of Goku

2003 reissue

In 2003 Columbia reissued the Complete Song Collection with new licensed artwork and the Makafushigi Adventure! remix track, making the album's track list identical to disc one of the Great Complete Collection set.

Track listing:
摩訶不思議アドベンチャー!Makafushigi Adobenchā/Mystical Adventure!
Mr.ドリームを探せMr. Dorīmu o Sagase/Hunt for Mr. Dream
青き旅人たちAoki Tabibito-tachi/The Blue Travelers
不思議ワンダーランドFushigi Wandārando/Mystery Wonderland
武天老師の教えMuten Rôshi no Oshie/Teachings of Muten Rôshi
孫悟空ソングSon Gokū Songu/Son Goku Song
ウルフハリケーンUrufu Harikēn/Wolf Hurricane
風を感じてKaze o Kanjite/Feel the Wind
めざせ天下一Mezase Tenka-ichi/Aim to Be the Greatest On Earth
夢をおしえてYume o Oshiete/Tell Me Your Dreams
レッド リボン アーミーReddo Ribon Āmī/Red Ribbon Army
初恋は雲にのってHatsukoi wa Kumo ni Notte/Riding On A Cloud Is My First Love
燃えるハートで~レッドリボン軍をやっつけろ~Moeru Hāto de~Reddo Ribon Gun o Yattsukero/With a Burning Heart: Defeat the Red Ribbon Army
悟空のGOKIGENジャーニーGokū no GOKIGEN Jānī/Happy Journey of Goku
ドラゴンボール伝説Doragon Bōru Densetsu/Dragon Ball Legend
ロマンティックあげるよRomantikku Ageru yo/I'll Give You a Romantic Night
摩訶不思議アドベンチャー!(ニュー・リミックス・ロング・ヴァージョン)Makafushigi Adobenchā (Nyū Rimikkusu Rongu Vājon)/Mystical Adventure (New Remix Long Version)

Dragon Ball Z Hit Song Collection series (1989–1996)

The Dragon Ball Z Hits Song Collection series is a long series of releases that spans 21 regular installments, as well as four mega collection volumes under the name of Dragon Ball Z Complete Song Collection.

Dragon Ball & Dragon Ball Z: Great Complete Collection (1994)

 is a five disc CD soundtrack set of Dragon Ball and Dragon Ball Z. It was released by Columbia on April 1, 1994 in Japan only.

Disc One: Dragon Ball Song Collection:

魔訶不思議アドベンチャー!Makafushigi Adobenchā!/Mystical Adventure!
Mr.ドリームを探せMr. Dorīmu o Sagase/Hunt for Mr. Dream
青き旅人たちAoki Tabibito-tachi/The Blue Travelers
不思議ワンダーランドFushigi Wandārando/Mystery Wonderland
武天老師の教えMuten Rôshi no Oshie/The Teachings of Muten Roshi
孫悟空ソングSon Gokū Songu/Son Goku Song
ウルフハリケーンUrufu Harikēn/Wolf Hurricane
風を感じてKaze o Kanjite/Feel the Wind
めざせ天下一Mezase Tenkaichi/Aim To Be The Greatest On Earth
夢をおしえてYume o Oshiete/Tell Me Your Dreams
レッドリボンアーミーReddo Ribon Āmī/Red Ribbon Army
初恋は雲にのってHatsukoi wa Kumo ni Notte/Riding on a Cloud is My First Love 
燃えるハートで~レッドリボン軍をやっつけろMoeru Hāto de~Reddo Ribon Gun o Yattsukero/With A Burning Heart: Defeat The Red Ribbon Army
悟空のGOKIGENジャーニーGokū no GOKIGEN Jānī/Happy Journey of Goku
ドラゴンボール伝説Doragon Bōru Densetsu/Dragon Ball Legend
ロマンティックあげるよRomantikku Ageru Yo/I'll Give You A Romantic Night
魔訶不思議アドベンチャー!(ニュー・リミックス・ロング・ヴァージョン)Makafushigi Adobenchā! (Nyū Rimikkusu Rongu Vājon) /Mystical Adventure (New Remix Long Version)

Disc Two: Dragon Ball BGM Collection:

魔訶不思議アドベンチャー! (TVサイズ)Makafushigi Adobenchā! (TV Saizu) /Mystical Adventure! (TV Size)
旅立ちTabidachi/Setting Out
魔訶不思議アドベンチャー!(インストゥルメンタル)Makafushigi Adobenchâ! (Insuturumentaru)/Mystical Adventure! (Instrumental)
セクシーギャル・ブルマSekushī Gyaru Buruma/Sexy Girl Bulma
ドラゴンボールの謎Doragon Bōru no Nazo/Dragon Ball of Mystery
ファンキー亀仙人Fankī Kame-Sen'nin/Funky Kame-Sen'nin
大荒野Dai-Kôya/Great Wilderness
妖怪出没Yôkai Shutsubotsu/Phantom Apparition
野心Yashin/Ambition
危険がいっぱいKiken ga Ippai/Danger is Everywhere
神龍出現Shenron Shutsugen/Shenlong Appears
ピラフとその部下Pirafu to Sono Buka/Pilaf and His Henchmen
野性の少年Yasei no Shônen/Boy of The Wild
亀仙流のきびしい修業Kame-Sen Ryô no Kibishi Shūgyô/Strict Training School of Kame-Sen
第二十一回天下一武道会Dai-Nijūikkai Tenkaichi Budôkai/The 21st Tenkaichi Budôkai
赤いリボンAkai Ribon/Red Ribbon
光るブルーの眼Hikaru Burū no Me/Shining Eyes of Blue
殺し屋"桃白白"Koroshiya "Tao Paipai"/The Assassin "Tao Pai-Pai"
カリン塔のカリン様Karin-Tô no Karin-sama/Master Karin of Karin Tower
第二十二回天下一武道会Dai-Nijūni-Kai Tenkaichi Budôkai/The 22nd Tenkaichi Budôkai
ピッコロ大魔王の恐怖Pikkoro-Daimaô no Kyôfu/The Terror of Piccolo-Daimaô
亀仙人最後の魔封波Kame-Sen'nin Saigo no Mafūba/Kame-Sen'nin's Final Mafuba
孫悟空の逆襲Son Gokū no Gyakushū/Counterattack of Son Goku
波乱の天下一武道会Haran no Tenkaichi Budôkai/The Tumultuous Tenkaichi Budôkai
因縁の対決!悟空とピッコロIn'nen no Taiketsu! Gokū to Pikkoro/The Fateful Confrontation! Goku and Piccolo
ドラゴンボールの贈り物Doragon Bōru no Okurimono/Gift of The Dragon Balls
ロマンティックあげるよ (TVサイズ)Romantikku Ageru Yo (TV Saizu) /I'll Give You A Romantic Night (TV Size)

Disc Three: Dragon Ball Z Song Collection:

CHA-LA HEAD-CHA-LA
あいつは孫悟空Aitsu wa Son Gokū/He's That Damn Son Goku
燃えろ!ドラゴン・ソルジャーズMoero! Doragon Sorujāzu/Burn, Dragon Soldier!
天下一ゴバンTenkaichi Gohan/World's Greatest Gohan
ピッコロさんだ~いすき♡Pikkoro-san Da~isuki♡/I Lo~ve Mr. Piccolo♡
戦(I・KU・SA)Ikusa (I-KU-SA)/Battle
まるごとMarugoto/The Whole World
ソリッドステート・スカウターSoriddo Sutēto Sukautā/Solid State Scouter
光の旅Hikari no Tabi/Journey of Light
「ヤ」なことには元気玉!!"Ya" na Koto ni wa Genki-Dama!!/There's A Genki-Dama In Bad Things!!
とびっきりの最強対最強Tobikkiri no Saikyô tai Saikyô/The Incredible Mightiest vs. Mightiest
HERO(キミがヒーロー)HERO (Kimi ga Hīrō) /Hero (You're The Hero)
GIRIGIRI~世界極限GIRIGIRI—Sekai Kyokugen--/At the Brink: The Earth's Limit
青い風のHOPEAoi Kaze no HOPE/Blue Wind of Hope
バーニング・ファイト~熱戦・烈戦・超激戦Bāningu Faito—Nessen-Ressen-Chôgekisen--/Burning Fight: A Close, Intense, Super-Fierce Battle
でてこいとびきりZENKAIパワー!Detekoi Tobikiri ZENKAI Pawā!/Come Out, Incredible ZENKAI Power!
WE GOTTA POWER
僕達は天使だったBoku-tachi wa Tenshi Datta/We Use To Be Angels

Disc Four: Dragon Ball Z BGM Collection:

CHA-LA HEAD-CHA-LA (TVサイズ)CHA-LA HEAD-CHA-LA (TV Saizu) /CHA-LA HEAD-CHA-LA (TV-Size)
プロローグ&サブタイトルIPurorōgu & Sabutaitoru Wan/Prologue & Subtitle I
かつてない恐怖Katsute Nai Kyôfu/A New Kind of Fear
あの世でファイト!Ano Yo de Faito!/Fight in the Afterlife!
孫悟飯とピッコロ大魔王Son Gohan to Pikkoro Daimaō/Son Gohan & Great Demon King Piccolo
サイヤ人来たる!!Saiyajin Kitaru!!/Saiyans Arrive!!
天下分け目の超決戦!!Tenka-Wakeme no Chô-Kessen!!/The Fateful Deciding Battle!!
暗雲うずまくナメック星An'un Uzumaku Namekku-Sei/Dark Clouds Swirl over Planet Namek
間にあえ!!ななつのドラゴンボールMa ni Ae!! Nanatsu No Doragon Bōru/Reach the Seven Dragon Balls in Time!!
恐怖のギニュー特戦隊Kyôfu no Ginyū Tokusentai/The Fearsome Ginyu Special Corps
怪物フリーザVS伝説の超サイヤ人Kaibutsu Furîza VS Densetsu no Sūpā Saiyajin/The Monster Freeza vs. Super Saiyan of Legend
消えるナメック星と希望Kieru Namekkusei to Kibô/Planet Namek, Along with Hope, Vanishes
未来から来た少年Mirai Kara Kita Shônen/The Boy Who Came From The Future
人造人間街へ...Jinzôningen Machi e.../To the City, Artificial Humans...
阻止せよ!セルの完全体Soshi Seyo! Seru No Kanzentai/Prevent It! Cell's Perfect Form
死を呼ぶセルゲームShi o Yobu Seru Gêmu/The Death-Summoning Cell Games
大団円~もうひとつの結末Daidan'en~Mô Hitotsu Ketsumatsu/The Finale: One More Ending
さよなら戦士たちSayonara Senshi-tachi/Farewell, Warriors 
でてこいとびきりZENKAIパワー! (TVサイズ)Detekoi Tobikiri ZENKAI Pawā! (TV Saizu) /Come Out, Incredible ZENKAI Power! (TV-Size)
WE GOTTA POWER (TVサイズ)WE GOTTA POWER (TV Saizu) /We Gotta Power (TV-Size)
プロローグ&サブタイトルIIPurorōgu & Sabutaitoru Tzū/Prologue & Subtitle II
ニューヒーロー登場Nyū Hīrō Tanjô/A New Hero is Born
ANGEL
再開!天下一武道会Saikai! Tenkaichi Budôkai/Reconvene! The Tenkaichi Budôkai
正義を愛する者!Seigi o Ai Suru Mono!/Those Who Love Justice!
僕達は天使だった (TVサイズ)Bokutachi wa Tenshi Datta (TV Saizu) /We Use To Be Angels (TV-Size)

Disc Five: Theatrical Dragon Ball, Dragon Ball Z BGM Collection:

魔訶不思議アドベンチャー! (TVサイズ・インストゥルメンタル)Makafushigi Adobenchā! (TV Saizu Insuturumentaru) /Mystical Adventure! (TV Size Instrumental)
神龍の伝説Shenron no Densetsu/Legend of Shenlong
魔神城のねむり姫Majin-Jô no Nemuri Hime/The Sleeping Princess in the Devil's Castle
魔訶不思議大冒険Makafushigi Dai-Bôken/Mystical Great Adventure
ロマンティックあげるよ (TVサイズ・インストゥルメンタル)Romantikku Ageru Yo (TV Saizu Insuturumentaru) /I'll Give You a Romantic Night (TV-Size Instrumental)
CHA-LA HEAD-CHA-LA(インストゥルメンタル)CHA-LA HEAD-CHA-LA (Insuturumentaru)/CHA-LA HEAD-CHA-LA (Instrumental)
ドラゴンボールZDoragon Bōru Zetto/Dragon Ball Z
この世で一番強いヤツKono Yo de Ichiban Tsuyoi Yatsu/The World's Strongest Guy
地球まるごと超決戦Chikyū Marugoto Chô-Kessen/Super Deciding Battle for the Entire Planet Earth
超サイヤ人だ孫悟空Sūpā Saiyajin Da Son Gokū/Son Goku the Super Saiyan
とびっきりの最強対最強Tobikkiri no Saikyô tai Saikyô/The Incredible Mightiest vs. Mightiest
激突!!100億パワーの戦士たちGekitotsu!! 100-Oku Pawā no Senshi-tachi/Clash!! 100,000,000 Powerful Warriors
極限バトル!!三大超サイヤ人Kyokugen Batoru!! San Dai Sūpā Saiyajin/Extreme Battle!! The Three Great Super Saiyans
燃えつき炉ろ!!熱戦・烈戦・超激戦Moetsukiro!! Nessen - Retsu Sen - Chô-Gekisen/Burn Up!! A Close, Intense, Super-Fierce Battle
銀河ギリギリ!!ぶっちぎりの凄い奴Ginga Giri-Giri!! Bucchigiri no Sugoi Yatsu/The Galaxy at the Brink!! The Super Incredible Guy
銀河を超えてライジング・ハイGinga o Koete Raijingu Hai/Surpassing the Galaxy, Rising High

Dragon Ball: Original USA TV Soundtrack Recording (1995)

Dragon Ball: Original USA TV Soundtrack Recording is the official US soundtrack Dragon Ball. It was recorded in 1995 and released in album form two years later during 1997, along with Saban's English dub soundtrack for Dragon Ball Z. The score was written and composed by Vancouver-based musician Peter Berring, who was hired by the dub's producer Funimation. It includes the theme song known by fans as "Gotta Find That Dragon Ball!" which was written by Brian Griffith. It is the only US soundtrack of the show to be produced for the consumer.

Track listing:
Main Title
The Game Begins
Bulma and Goku
Oolong the Terrible
Yamcha the Warrior
Disappearing Dragon Balls
Power of the Master
The Emperor's Prize
Awaken the Dragon
The Awakening Dragon
Goku's Curse
Victory
End Title

Dragon Ball Z: Original USA Television Soundtrack (1996)

Dragon Ball Z: Original USA Television Soundtrack is the first US domestic soundtrack for Dragon Ball Z, released in 1997. It features 12 tracks of music from Saban Entertainment's soundtrack for the Saiyan arc. All of the music (excluding the opening and closing themes) was written and performed by Ron Wasserman during 1996 at his home in Los Angeles, although Shuki Levy and Kussa Mahehi (Haim Saban) were credited on the album for contractual reasons.

Jason Ankeny of Allmusic gave this soundtrack 2.5 stars out of 5.

Track listing:
Main Title
The Arrival of Raditz
The World's Strongest Team
Gohan's Hidden Powers
Goku's Unusual Journey
Gohan's Metamorphosis
Gohan Makes a Friend
Rock the Dragon (DBZ opening theme)
Trouble on Arlia
Home for Infinite Losers
Princess Snake's Hospitality
Escape from Piccolo
End Title

Dragonball Z American Soundtrack series
Dragonball Z American Soundtrack series is the domestic soundtrack collection drawn from Bruce Faulconer's music for Dragon Ball Z; Faulconer's music for the series was commissioned by Funimation. These soundtracks were produced by Faulconer between 2001 and 2005.

The Best of Dragonball Z: Volume I

Dragonball Z American Soundtrack The Best of Dragonball Z: Volume I is the first release from the Dragonball Z American Soundtrack series of the anime Dragon Ball Z. The soundtrack was written and composed by Bruce Faulconer, produced by Faulconer Productions Music and released on May 8, 2001.

Track listing:
Dragon Ball Z
Call Out the Dragon
Future Trunks
Gohan Fights Frieza
The Makyo Star
Garlic Jr. Theme
King Cold
Frieza's Revival
Heroic Trunks
Android 16
Perfect Cell Runs
The Howling
Android 17 & 18
Destruction
Gohan & Icarus
The Cell Games
16 Rips Off Cell's Tail
Vegeta's Theme
Vegeta Powers Up
Vegeta - Super Saiyan
The Dragon Theme
Hyperbolic Time Chamber
Goku's Spirit Bomb
Super Namek
Pikkon's Theme

The Best of Dragonball Z: Volume II

Dragonball Z American Soundtrack The Best of Dragonball Z: Volume II is the second release from the Dragonball Z American Soundtrack series of the anime Dragon Ball Z. The soundtrack was written and composed by Bruce Faulconer, produced by Faulconer Productions Music and released on May 8, 2001.

Track listing:
Hyperbolic Time Chamber
Goku and Gohan Train
Goku and Kai Face Off
Cell and Piccolo Face Off
Piccolo Angry
Piccolo and 17 Talk
Piccolo vs. 17
Androids Steal Truck
Groovy Discotech
Cell at Ball Club
Cell at Carnival
Weird Circus
Electronic Circus
Cell Contacts Goku
Imperfect Cell Theme
Cell Is Dead?
Cell Powers Up
Demon Mist
Dead Zone
Frieza vs. Spirit Bomb 1
Frieza vs. Spirit Bomb 2
Frieza's Death
Earth Music
Ginyu Transformation
Goku's SSJ Transformation
Space Room
Mysterious Person
Supreme Kai's Theme
Goku and Gohan in Time Chamber
Goku Battles 19
Goku Recovers

The Best of Dragonball Z: Volume III

Dragonball Z American Soundtrack The Best of Dragonball Z: Volume III is the third release in the Dragonball Z American Soundtrack series of the anime Dragon Ball Z. The music contained on the soundtrack was composed and performed by Bruce Faulconer, and was recorded at CakeMix Recording. The album was released by Faulconer Productions Music on May 8, 2001.

Track listing:
Wrestling Rock with Lead
Frieza Base
Trunks Appears
Trunks Powerup
Perfect Cell Theme
Droids vs. Bikers
Yamcha Meets Droids
Country Store
Grand Kai Blues
Grand Kai Rocks
Ox King Consoles
Truckin' 2
Underwater
Kame Sad
Kame Tough
Aristocratic British
Aerobics
Sage Music
Gohan Angers 2
Gohan Angers
Cell Juniors Theme
Vegeta Knows His Son
Gohan on Film
Goku Dies
Long Flashback
Gohan Powers Up
Mushroom March
Flight Training
Trunks and Goten
Videl Gets Hit
Videl Gets Up
Mysterious B
Videl Plummets
Trunks and Goten Spar
18 And Mighty Mask Standoff
Doubler's Prelude
Gohan vs. Doubler
Gohan vs. Doubler II
Vegeta's Red Power
Pre-Buu

The Best of Dragonball Z: Volume IV

Dragonball Z American Soundtrack The Best of Dragonball Z: Volume IV is the fourth release from the Dragonball Z American Soundtrack series of the anime Dragon Ball Z. The soundtrack was written and composed by Bruce Faulconer, produced by Faulconer Productions Music and released on August 5, 2003.

Track listing:
Frieza Transforms
Planet Namek Destruction
Energy Disk Music
Frieza Begs
Android 20 Destroys City
19 Almost Kills Goku
Eerie
Cell Theme (With Choir)
Cell and Piccolo Fight
Cell Transforms
16 and the Squirrels
King Kai
King Kai Dies
Snake Way
Kame's Tale
Cell Returns
New Earth Music
Wimps Get Whacked
Goten's Lizard
Nail's Gift
Trunks Wins
Pui Pui Fights Vegeta
Pui Pui Struggles
Room Music
Yucon Sucks
Goku and Kai Standoff
Relief Rock
Satan Gives Speech
Goku Vs. Vegeta
Trunks Jumps In
Boys Put to Sleep
Turbulence
SSJ3 Power Up
Tourney Talk
Kid Buu Is Waiting
Buu Is Fighting
Pan's Song
Uub in the Tournament
DBZ Finale

Dragonball Z: Trunks Compendium I

Dragonball Z American Soundtrack Dragonball Z: Trunks Compendium I was the first release in the Dragon Ball Z American Soundtrack series of the anime Dragon Ball Z. The soundtrack was composed by Bruce Faulconer and was recorded at CakeMix Recording. It was released by Faulconer Productions Music on April 24, 2001. This album is considered a character album, featuring music related to one of Faulconer's favorite characters, Trunks.

Track listing:
Mysterious Youth
Prelude to Conflict
Prince of the Saiyans
The Eyes and the Sword
Battle Preparations
Palace in the Clouds
Training
Race to the Island
Trunks Meets Goku
Trunks Story
Time Chamber
Androids
You're Fighting the Wrong Androids
Android Battle
Mysterious Youth Revealed
Home Sweet Home
Back at the Lab
400 GS
SSJ Trunks
Trunks vs. Cell
A Little Help from a Friend 
The Saga Continues

Bonus Tracks:
DBZ Episode #120, Part I
DBZ Episode #120, Part II

Dragonball Z: Buu the Majin Sagas

Dragonball Z American Soundtrack Dragonball Z: Buu the Majin Sagas is the sixth release from the Dragonball Z American Soundtrack series of the anime Dragon Ball Z. The soundtrack was written and composed by Bruce Faulconer, produced by Faulconer Productions Music and released on August 5, 2003.

Track listing:
Vegeta Gets Bean
Majin Theme
Turned to Stone
Gohan vs Doubler III
Gohan vs Doubler IV
Babidi Casts Spell
Majin-Vegeta
Panic
Vegeta vs. Goku
Buu's Theme
Evil Majin Theme
Buu Takes Eyes
Babidi and Buu
Goku Senses Buu
Buu Eats Cookie
Mystery of the Z-Sword
Buu Takes Punch
Buu Throws Worm
Spirit Bomb Triumphant 
Buu Busts Out
Piccolo and Babidi
Bad News
Van Zant's Ride
Old Kai's Dance
Scary Buu
Evil Buu
Road to the Chamber
Super Buu 
Buu Anticipates
Kid Buu
Goku Trains For Buu

Android 18: The Android Sagas

Dragonball Z American Soundtrack Android 18: The Android Sagas is the seventh release from the Dragonball Z American Soundtrack series of the anime Dragon Ball Z. The soundtrack was written and composed by Bruce Faulconer, produced by Faulconer Productions Music and released on September 9, 2003. This is a character album dedicated to Android 18.

Track listing:
1. 17 - 18 Episodic Theme 
2. Android Shoots 
3. 17 & 18 Kill All 
4. 17 - 18 Flashback 
5. Serious to Eerie Suspense 
6. 17 & 18 Kill All, v2 
7. Tien Finds Yamcha 
8. Androids Extended 
9. Androids vs. Civilians 
10. 16 & 18 
11. 17 Rebels 
12. 16 Charges 
13. 17 - 18 Extension 
14. 17 - 18 Episodic Theme 
15. 19 Attacks Goku 
16. 20 Sucks 
17. Androids, With Effects 
18. Dr. Gero 
19. 16 in Lab - Hits 
20. Android Chase 
21. Droids Driving 
22. Beyond Belief, Fast Remix 
23. Weird & Backwards 
24. Gang Fight 
25. 17 - 18 Face Off 
26. 20 Catches Krillin 
27. Weird Circus, with Trumpet 
28. Piccolo Disarms 20 
29. 20 vs. Hunter (with delay) 
30. Dr. Gero Dies 
31. Beyond Belief Techno 
32. Truck Explodes 
33. Piccolo Attacks 20 
34. Techno Flying 
35. 17 Charges 
36. Androids Extended 
3. "Android 18 Dance Mix"

The Best of Dragonball Z: Volume V

Dragonball Z American Soundtrack The Best of Dragonball Z: Volume V is the eighth release from the Dragonball Z American Soundtrack series of the anime Dragon Ball Z. The soundtrack was written and composed by Bruce Faulconer, produced by Faulconer Productions Music and released on July 13, 2004.

Track listing:
Goku vs. Jeice & Burter
Goku's Theme
Ginyu Force Theme
Piccolo and Nail Fuse
Goku's Nightmare
Say Goodbye to Namek
Mr. Shu's Lesson
Mr. Shu's S&M Class
Cops Arriving
Blowing Up the Lab
Goku's Dream
Heaven Sent Trunks
Bulma's Car / 20 Escapes
Episodic Trunks
Krillin and Trunks Arrive
Tournament March
Jazzy Tunes
Goku Volunteers Gohan
King Yemma
Pterodactyl Attack
Gohan and Greasers
Chi Chi and Videl
Gohan Ruins the Shot
Brass Fanfare
Briefs II
Hercule's Orchestra
Face-Off
Briefs III
18 Makes a Deal
Doubler Does Kabito
Yacon Blows
Shin Panics
Turned to Stone II
Full Power
Vegeta Stops
Vegeta Fools Goku
Boys Flying
Gotenks Is Born
Gohan Approaches
Intro to Finale and Closing Music

The Best of Dragonball Z: Volume Six the Lost Tracks of DBZ

Dragonball Z American Soundtrack Best of Dragonball Z: Volume Six the Lost Tracks of DBZ is the ninth and final release from the Dragonball Z American Soundtrack series of the anime Dragon Ball Z. The soundtrack was written and composed by Bruce Faulconer, produced by Faulconer Productions Music and released on May 3, 2005.

Track listing:
Cell Yells
Cell's Slow Theme
Cell Kills Man
Cell Destroys Island
Gohan vs. Cell
Cell Kills Gunman
It's Up to Dende
Vegeta Snoozes
Race and Crash
Fight Hits
Vegeta's Vision
Vegeta's in Space
Vegeta Fights Frieza
Goku and Shenron
Piccolo vs. Frieza
Bulma and the Frog
Bulma and Bubbles
Farm Destruction
Garlic Transformation
Crazy Fight
Finding the Capsule
Boogieman
Gohan Meets Mr. Shu
Gohan and Chichi Argue
Chichi Mission
Industrial
Goku Is Falling
Krillin Powers Up
Goku vs. Caterpillar
Maron Leaves
Holy Water
Gohan SSJ
Gohan's Sack
Gohan Hits Tree
Trunks Tell His Story
Trunks Power-Up
Power Music
Korin's Dinner
Hell Theme
Sharpner Runs
Healing
Group Watches
Hercule in Nightclub
Trunks Hits Hercule
Trunks Takes Mask
Majins Absorb Gohan
Flute and Strings
MM Splits
Hercule Arrives
Hercule Talks With Trunks
Cake Factory
Z-Fighters Pathétique

Dragon Ball Z: Best Song Collection "Legend of Dragonworld" (2006)

 is a two disc CD soundtrack, released by Columbia on February 22, 2006 in Japan only. Among the list of theme and image songs on this set, it also contains very popular image songs from the Hit Song Collection Series as well.

It peaked at number 197 on the Japanese Albums Chart.

Disc One:
 CHA-LA HEAD-CHA-LA
 でてこいとびきりZENKAIパワー!Detekoi Tobikiri ZENKAI Pawā!/Come Out, Incredible ZENKAI Power!
 まるごとMarugoto/The Whole World
 永遠の地球Eien no Chikyū/Earth of Eternity
 あいつは孫悟空Aitsu wa Son Gokū/He's That Damn Son Goku
 Dancing in the space
 戦(I・KU・SA)Ikusa (I-KU-SA)/Battle
 光の旅Hikari no Tabi/Journey of Light
 「ヤ」なことには元気玉!!"Ya" na Koto ni wa Genki-Dama!!/There's a Genki-Dama in Bad Things!!
 とびっきりの最強対最強Tobikkiri no Saikyô tai Saikyô/The Incredible Mightiest vs. Mightiest
 パワー オブ スマイルPawā obu Sumairu/Power of Smile
 MIND POWER...気...MIND POWER...Ki.../Mind Power...Energy...
 MESSAGE FROM FUTURE...未来からの伝言...MESSAGE FROM FUTURE...Mirai Kara no Dengon.../A Message From the Future
 WHITE&WORLD&TRUE...白と世界と心...WHITE & WORLD & TRUE...Shiro to Sekai to Kokoro.../White, the World, and the Heart
 HERO(キミがヒーロー)HERO (Kimi ga Hīrō)/Hero (You're the Hero)
 Brain Dance
 GIRIGIRI-世界極限-GIRI GIRI—Sekai Kyokugen--/At the Brink: The Earth's Limit

Disc Two:
 黄金のコンパスÔgon no Konpasu/Compass of Gold
 アクアリウムの夜Akuariumu no Yoru/Aquarium of Night
 Cool Cool ダンディCool Cool Dandi/Cool Cool Dandy
 運命の日~魂VS魂~Unmei no Hi~Tamashii VS Tamashii~/Day of Destiny: Spirit vs. Spirit
 夜明けの子供たちYoake no Kodomo-tachi/Children of the Dawn
 FOR EVER~
 青い風のHOPEAoi Kaze no HOPE/Blue Wind of Hope
 バーニング・ファイト-熱戦・烈戦・超激戦-Bāningu Faito—Nessen-Ressen-Chôgekisen--/Burning Fight: a Close, Intense, Super-Fierce Battle
 銀河を超えてライジング・ハイGinga o Koete Raijingu Hai/Surpassing the Galaxy, Rising High
 飛び出せ!ヒーローTobidase! Hīrō/Fly Away, Hero!
 WE GOTTA POWER
 君の空へKimi no Sora e/To Your Sky
 奇蹟のビッグ・ファイトKiseki no Biggu FaitoThe Miraculous Big Fight
 ドラゴンパワー∞(むげんだい)Doragon Pawā Mugendai/Dragon Power Infinity
 最強のフュージョンSaikyô no Fyūjon/Mightiest of Fusion
 俺がやらなきゃ誰がやるOre ga Yaranakya Dare ga Yaru/If I Don't Do It, Who Will?
 僕達は天使だったBoku-tachi wa Tenshi Datta/We Use to be Angels

Dragon Ball Z: BGM Collection (2006)

 is a three disc CD soundtrack set of the BGM (background music) from Dragon Ball Z done by series composer Shunsuke Kikuchi. It was released by Columbia Records on February 22, 2006 in Japan only. This set features the background music and theme songs found in the five disc Dragon Ball & Dragon Ball Z: Great Complete Collection set as well some background music and theme song produced for the later part of the TV series and movies 10-13 that came after the Great Complete Collection was released.

Disc One:
CHA-LA HEAD-CHA-LA (TVサイズ)CHA-LA HEAD-CHA-LA (TV Saizu)/CHA-LA HEAD-CHA-LA (TV Size)
プロローグ&サブタイトル1Purorōgu & Sabutaitoru wan/Prologue & Subtitle 1
かつてない恐怖Katsutenai Kyôfu/Fear Unfelt Before
あの世でファイト!Ano yo de Faito!/Fight on in the Other World!
孫悟飯とピッコロ大魔王Son Gohan to Pikkoro Daimaô/Son Gohan and Demon King Piccolo
CHA-LA HEAD-CHA-LA (Variations)
ブリッジ・コレクションBurijji Korekushon/Bridge Collection
サイヤ人来たる!!Saiyajin Kitaru!!/Saiyans are Coming!!
天下分け目の超決戦!!Tenka Wakeme no Chô Kessen!!/Super Deciding Battle to Divide Heaven from Earth!!
悟飯のテーマGohan no Theme/Theme of Gohan
嗚呼,修行の日々Ah, Shugyô no Hibi/Alas, the Days of Training
暗雲うずまくナメック星An'un Uzumaku Namekku Hoshi/Dark Clouds Swirling Over Namek Star
間にあえ!!ななつのドラゴンボールMani Ae!! Nanatsu no Dragonbōru/Make it in Time!! The Seven Dragon Balls
恐怖のギニュー特戦隊Kyôfu no Ginyū Tokusentai/The Fearsome Ginyu Special Task Force
怪物フリーザVS伝説の超サイヤ人Kaibutsu Furīza Vs. Densetsu no Sūpā Saiyajin/The Monster Freeza Vs. the Super Saiyan of Legend
消えるナメック星と希望Kieru Namekku Hoshi to Kibô/Namek Star and Hope Vanish
でてこい とびきりZENKAIパワー! (TVサイズ)Detekoi Tobikiri ZENKAI Pawā! (TV Saizu)/Come Out, Incredible ZENKAI Power! (TV Size)
[劇場版ドラゴンボールZ SUITS] DRAGON BALL Z[Gekijô ban Doragon Bōru Zetto SUITS] DRAGON BALL Z /[Theatrical Dragon Ball Z Suites] Dragon Ball Z
[劇場版ドラゴンボールZ SUITS]この世で一番強いヤツ[Gekijô ban Doragon Bōru Zetto SUITS] Kono yo de Ichiban Tsuyoi Yatsu/[Theatrical Dragon Ball Z Suites] The Strongest in This World
戦(I・KU・SA) (MOVIEサイズ)Ikusa (I-KU-SA) (Movie Saizu)/Battle (Movie Size)
[劇場版ドラゴンボールZ SUITS]地球まるごと超決戦[Gekijô ban Doragon Bōru Zetto SUITS] Chikyū Marugoto Chô Kessen/[Theatrical Dragon Ball Z Suites] Super Deciding Battle for the Whole Earth
まるごと (MOVIEサイズ)Marugoto (Movie Saizu)/The Whole World (Movie Size)
[劇場版ドラゴンボールZ SUITS]超(スーパー)サイヤ人だ孫悟空[Gekijô ban Doragon Bōru Zetto SUITS] Chô Saiyajin da Son Gokū/[Theatrical Dragon Ball Z Suites] Son Goku the Super Saiyan
「ヤ」なことには元気玉!! (MOVIEサイズ)"Ya" na Koto ni wa Genki-Dama!! (Movie Saizu)/There's A Genki-Dama In Bad Things!! (Movie Size)
[劇場版ドラゴンボールZ SUITS]とびっきりの最強対最強[Gekijô ban Doragon Bōru Zetto SUITS] Tobikkiri no Saikyô tai Saikyô/[Theatrical Dragon Ball Z Suites] The Incredible Mightiest vs. Mightiest
とびっきりの最強対最強 (MOVIEサイズ)Tobikkiri no Saikyô tai Saikyô (Movie Saizu)/The Incredible Mightiest vs. Mightiest (Movie Size)

Disc Two:
CHA-LA HEAD-CHA-LA(インストゥルメンタル)CHA-LA HEAD-CHA-LA (Insuturumentaru)/CHA-LA HEAD-CHA-LA (Instrumental)
未来からきた少年Mirai Karakita Shônen/The Boy from the Future
人造人間 街へ...Jinzôningen Machi e.../The Artificial Humans go to Town
阻止せよ!セルの完全体Soshise Yo! Seru no Kanzen Karada/Prevent It! Cell's Perfect Body
死を呼ぶセルゲームShi wo Yobu Seru Gēmu/The Cell Game Which Calls Forth Death
大団円~もうひとつの結末Ōdan'en~Mô Hitotsu no Ketsumatsu/All's Well That Ends Well: One More Conclusion
さよなら戦士たちSayonara Senshi-tachi/Goodbye Warriors
[劇場版ドラゴンボールZ SUITS]激突!!100億パワーの戦士たち[Gekijô ban Doragon Bōru Zetto SUITS] Gekitotsu!! 100 Oku Pawā no Senshi-tachi/[THEATRICAL DRAGON BALL Z SUITES] Clash! 10 Billion Power Warriors
HERO(キミがヒーロー) (MOVIEサイズ)HERO (Kimi ga Hīrō) (Movie Saizu)/Hero (You're The Hero) (Movie Size)
[劇場版ドラゴンボールZ SUITS]極限バトル!!三大超サイヤ人[Gekijô ban Doragon Bōru Zetto SUITS] Kyokugen Batoru!! Sandai Sūpā Saiyajin/[THEATRICAL DRAGON BALL Z SUITES] Extreme Battle!! The Three Super Saiyans
GIRIGIRI-世界極限- (MOVIEサイズ)GIRIGIRI—Sekai Kyokugen-- (Movie Saizu)/At the Brink: The Earth's Limit (Movie Size)
[劇場版ドラゴンボールZ SUITS]燃えつきろ!!熱戦・烈戦・超激戦[Gekijô ban Doragon Bōru Zetto SUITS] Moe Tsukiro!! Nessen, Retsusen, Chôgekisen/[THEATRICAL DRAGON BALL Z SUITES] Burn Up!! Hot, Fierce, Super Violent Fight
バーニング・ファイト-熱戦・烈戦・超激戦- (MOVIEサイズ)Bāningu Faito—Nessen-Ressen-Chôgekisen-- (Movie Saizu)/Burning Fight: A Close, Intense, Super-Fierce Battle (Movie Size)
[劇場版ドラゴンボールZ SUITS]銀河ギリギリ!!ぶっちぎりの凄い奴[Gekijô ban Doragon Bōru Zetto SUITS] Ginga GiriGiri!! Bucchigiri no Sugoi Yatsu/[THEATRICAL DRAGON BALL Z SUITES] The Galaxy Last Moment!! A Phenomenally Awesome Guy
銀河を超えてライジング・ハイ (MOVIEサイズ)Ginga wo Koete, Rising High (Movie Saizu)/Surpass the Galaxy, Rising High (Movie Size)

Disc Three:
WE GOTTA POWER (TVサイズ)WE GOTTA POWER (TV Saizu)/We Gotta Power (TV Size)
プロローグ&サブタイトル2Purorōgu & Sabutaitoru Tzū/Prologue & Subtitle 2
ニューヒーロー登場New Hero Tôjô/Enter a New Hero
Angel
再開!天下一武道会Saikai! Tenkaichi Budôkai/Reunion! Tenkaichi Budokai
WE GOTTA POWER(インストゥルメンタル)WE GOTTA POWER (Insuturumentaru)/We Gotta Power (Instrumental)
僕達は天使だった(インストゥルメンタル)Boku-tachi wa Tenshi Datta (Insuturumentaru)/We Were Angels (Instrumental)
戦いの時,ふたたびTatakai no Toki Futatabi/The Time for Battle is Here Again
明日を信じて...Ashita wo Shinjite.../Believe in Tomorrow...
やっぱり最強孫悟空!!Yappari Saikyô Son Gokū!!/Son Goku is the Strongest After all!
僕達は天使だった (TVサイズ)(影山ヒロノブ)Boku-tachi wa Tenshi Datta (TV Saizu)/We Were Angels (TV Size)
[劇場版ドラゴンボールZ SUITS]危険なふたり!超(スーパー)戦士はねむれない[Gekijô ban DoragonbōruZetto SUITS] Kiken na Futari!! Sūpā Senshi Hanemurenai/[THEATRICAL DRAGON BALL Z SUITES] Danger!! The Super Warrior Can't Rest
奇蹟のビッグ・ファイト (MOVIEサイズ)Kiseki no Biggu Faito (Movie Saizu)/Astounding Big Fight (Movie Size)
[劇場版ドラゴンボールZ SUITS]超(スーパー)戦士撃破!!勝つのはオレだ[Gekijô ban Doragon Bōru Zetto SUITS] Sūpā Senshi Gekiha!! Katsu no wa Ore da/[THEATRICAL DRAGON BALL Z SUITES] Super Warriors Crushed!! I'll Be the Winner
ドラゴンパワー∞(むげんだい) (MOVIEサイズ)Doragon Pawā Mugendai (Movie Saizu)/Dragon Power Infinite (Movie Size)
[劇場版ドラゴンボールZ SUITS]復活のフュージョン!!悟空とベジータ[Gekijô ban Doragon Bōru Zetto SUITS] Fukkatsu no Fyūshon!! Gokū to Bejīta/[THEATRICAL DRAGON BALL Z SUITES] Rebirth of the Fusion!! Goku and Vegeta
最強のフュージョン (MOVIEサイズ)Saikyô no Fyūshon (Movie Size)/The Strongest Fusion (Movie Size)
[劇場版ドラゴンボールZ SUITS]龍拳爆発!!悟空がやらねば誰がやる[Gekijô ban Doragon Bōru Zetto SUITS] Ryūken Bakuhatsu!! Gokū ga Yaraneba Darega Yaru/[THEATRICAL DRAGON BALL Z SUITES] Ryuken Explosion!! If Goku Doesn't do it, Who Will
俺がやらなきゃ誰がやる (MOVIEサイズ)Ore ga Yaranakya Darega Yaru (Movie Saizu)/If I Don't Do It Who Will (Movie Size)

Dragon Ball Z Complete Song Collection Box: Mightiest Recorded Legend (2008)

 was released in 2008.

Disc One:
CHA-LA HEAD-CHA-LA
Dragon・World e Youkoso!
Mama wa Shiawase Inotteru
Aitsu wa Son Goku
Eien no Chikyuu
Shura-iro no Senshi
Moero! Dragon Soldiers
Trouble・Surfin'
Tenkaichi Gohan
Joushiki Nante NA★I☆SA
Oomori Gohan
Chikyuu Kara FOR THE HOME PLANET EARTH
Mirai Chizu
Tenka Muteki no Furukosu
Fly high
ALL ALONE
I♥(one・heart) Kounen

Disc Two:
Dancing in the space
Cosmic Chinese Melody
Good night my Blue
Bad Boy
Arashi no Zenchou~Mugon no Zawameki
Space Dance
Ikusa (I・KU・SA)
Piccolo-san Da~isuki
Solid State Scouter
Otassha Polka
Asa-Hiru-Yoru-Kimi-Boku
Fuke yo Kaze Yobe yo Shenron!
Sharereba Inochi no Izumi Waku Waku!!
Oretachi no Energy
Kokoro Kara Nureta Futari
Onna no Ko wa Tsumitsukuri
Makafushigi Adventure! (New Remix Long Version)
Aru Hoshi no Shi★
happy Birthday
CHA-LA HEAD-CHA-LA (Space Version)

Disc Three:
Kin-iro Ta・ma・go
Marugoto <New Remix Long Version>
Arijigoku
Tamashii no Michi
Aru Hoshi no Shi★★
Hikari no Tabi
"Ya" na Koto ni wa Genki-Dama!!
My Pace
Mai・My・Mainichi
Kikai no You ni... -Battling Machine-
Yume no Kakera
Dragon ONDO
Kuchibue no Kimochi
Tobikkiri no Saikyou Tai Saikyou
Power of Smile
Me wo Tojireba Kantan
Kaze no You ni Hoshi no You ni «Part One»
Kaze no You ni Hoshi no You ni «Part Two»

Disc Four:
Detekoi Tobikiri ZENKAI Power!
Dareka-san to Ii Tenki
Toki to Hikari no Shita de
Dragon Magic Carnival
CAPSULE CORP.
Ichido wa Kekkon Shitai Mambo
Vegeta-sama no Oryouri Jigoku!! ~"Okonomiyaki" no Kan~
Omoide no Tenkaichi Budoukai
Sharereba Inochi no Izumi Waku-Waku!! Two
Kuchibue no Kimochi • Piccolo Hen
I・ke・na・i Urara Magic
MIND POWER...Ki...
MESSAGE FROM FUTURE...Mirai Kara no Dengon...
WARNING OF DANGER...Keikoku...
WELCOME HOME, MY BOY...Kaze no Namae...
SUPER Plus POWER Equals MELODY...Chou-Ryoku Fushi...
IT'S A SMALL WORLD...Koyubi no Shita de...

Disc Five:
SWEET LOVELY MIDNIGHT...Tsuki no Uragawa...
WHITE & WORLD & TRUE...Shiro to Sekai to Kokoro
HERO (Kimi ga Hero)
Sonna Kibun de
Ryuusei Toshokan ~Comet Library~
E na E
Keep my way
HO・TA・LU
Ikashita Energy
Saimin Banana
Brain Dance
GIRIGIRI -Sekai Kyokugen-
Ougon no Compass
VOICE
Aquarium no Yoru
KOMA
Hoshi no Mita Yume

Disc Six:
PLEASE ISSHOU NO ONEGAI!!
Delight to you...
LED TRAIN de GO!GO!GO!
spacepeopleDBZ
roller-through 55
Cool Cool Dandy
WILD DANCE NIGHT《Yoake Made Tsuppashire》
Heartbreak Melody, Myou ni
Detekoi Tobikiri ZENKAI Power! 《Super House Version》
Unmei no Hi ~Tamashii VS Tamashii~
I'm a positive girl!!
Yoake no Kodomo-tachi
FOR EVER~
Chousenjou
Ijiwaru Shinai De Ne...
Aoi Kaze no HOPE
Burning・Fight -Nessen・Ressen・Chougekisen-

Disc Seven:
Mizu-iro Seinin
Sora Meguru Bouken
Nanika ga... (Michi no Chikara)
Love Jet
Trickster to Kaettekita Mirai
Boku wa, Massugu Machi wa, Massugu
Mother Universe
Tobidase! Hero
Watashi no Magician
Hoshi no Triangle
Sora to Ame to...
Joke Gurai Iwasero yo...
My song for you
Ginga wo Koete Rising・High
Tobidase! Hero (reprise)
WE GOTTA POWER
Hey You, Crasher
Jumpin' Jump!!
Toki yo Tomare ~MY NAME IS FATHER~

Disc Eight:
Boku wa Mahoutsukai
FIGHT OH FIGHTING ROAD
Que Sera
Ato wa Silence...
Chikara wo Koete
Janjaka My Way
THIS IN LIFE!
Good-Bye Mr.Loneliness ~Hikari no Kanata e~
Majin Buu ni Sasageru Ballad
Seiki-Matsu Banzai!
HIPPY HOPPY SHAKE! UTA
OSSAN'S DILEMMA
Saraba Namida yo
Kinou no Yume, Kyou no Hikari -Silent Night Morning Moon-
100-Oku no Friends
Majin Buu no Higeki
Memories -Yatsu no Inai Yoru-

Disc Nine:
perfume N°18 ~Mashou no Kaori~
Hitomi no Naka no Chikyuu
Growin' Up Itsuka Mata Aeru Hi Made...
Bokutachi wa Tenshi Datta
Plus Alpha (+α)
Koko ni Oide yo
Shizen no Aizu
Marugoto
Kiseki no Big・Fight
Dragon Ball no Densetsu
Dragon Power Mugendai
Chiisana Senshi ~Goten to Trunks no Theme~
Saikyou no Fusion
Ai wa Ballad no You ni ~Vegeta no Theme~
Ore ga Yaranakya Dare ga Yaru
Yuusha no Fue ~Tapion no Theme~
Eien no Yakusoku Duet Version
Hikari no WILLPOWER

Disc Ten:
Namida Mitai na Ame ga Furu
Shakunetsu no FIGHTING
Mahiru no Yami
SIGN ~Kizashi~
FIRE OF BLACK ~Kuroi Honoo~
NEVER ENDING, NEVER GIVE UP
Kimi no Sora e
Koi no NAZONAZO
Dragon・World e Youkoso! 《Super House Version》
Bad Boy 《Super Migaite Mite yo Version》
CHA-LA HEAD-CHA-LA 《Super Adventure Version》
KUKO'S DANCE MEDLEY 《Ultra New Edition》
KAGEYAMA'S POWER MEDLEY 《Ultra New Edition》
Sunao na Hikari Yasashii Shisen

Disc Eleven:
CHA-LA HEAD-CHA-LA ~JUNGLE FEVER MIX~
BATTLE SPECTACLE MEDLEY
FOR EVER~'96 ~PIANO NEW VERSION~
GIRIGIRI -Sekai Kyokugen- ~EXTREME HARD METAL MIX~
PLEASE ISSHOU NO ONEGAI ~ACID CLUB MIX~
perfume N°18 ~DANGEROUS FRAGRANT MIX~
Ginga wo Koete Rising・High ~GALAXY ADVENTURE MIX~
Tobidase! Hero ~DREAM THEATRE MIX~
Hikari no Tabi '96 ~CLASSICAL NEW VERSION~
CHA-LA HEAD-CHA-LA 2006
Detekoi Tobikiri ZENKAI Power! 2006
Eien no Chikyuu 2006

Disc Twelve:
Ikusa (I・KU・SA) 2006
Hikari no Tabi 2006
WHITE & WORLD & TRUE...Shiro to Sekai to Kokoro... 2006
HERO (Kimi ga Hero) 2006
Ougon no Compass 2006
Cool Cool Dandy 2006
Burning・Fight -Nessen・Ressen・Chougekisen- 2006
Mother・Universe 2006
WE GOTTA POWER 2006
Bokutachi wa Tenshi Datta 2006
Kimi no Sora e 2006
CHA-LA HEAD-CHA-LA (Karaoke)
Detekoi Tobikiri ZENKAI Power! (Karaoke)
WE GOTTA POWER (Karaoke)
Bokutachi wa Tenshi Datta (Karaoke)

Disc Thirteen:
Burning・Fight -Nessen・Ressen・Chougekisen- (Live Version)
Saikyou no Fusion (Live Version)
Aoi Kaze no HOPE (Live Version)
Aitsu wa Son Goku (Live Version)
Toki to Hikari no Shita de (Live Version)
Hikari no Tabi (Live Version)
Dragon Power Mugendai (Live Version)
CHA-LA HEAD-CHA-LA (Live Version)
Bokutachi wa Tenshi Datta (Live Version)
WE GOTTA POWER (Live Version)
Marugoto (Live Version)
CHA-LA HEAD-CHA-LA (English Version)
WE GOTTA POWER (English Version)
Bokutachi wa Tenshi Datta (English Version)

Dragon Ball Kai: Original Soundtrack (2009)

Dragon Ball Kai: Original Soundtrack is the first official soundtrack of the anime Dragon Ball Z Kai released on August 19, 2009 on CD in Japan only. The soundtrack includes the opening, ending, and background music from the show. There is a limited edition available including three bonus tracks and a Data Carddass card holder. The soundtrack includes thirty-three tracks. Some of those tracks include TV-size versions of the opening and ending themes (previously released in CD singles, episode recap and preview music, and more. The limited edition include three extra bonus tracks.

Track listing:
ドラゴンボール改～タイトル～ Dragon Ball Kai ~Title~
大冒険の予感Premonition of a Grand Adventure
Dragon Soul (TVサイズ) Dragon Soul (TV Size)
ドラゴンボール改～サブタイトル～ Dragon Ball Kai ~Subtitle~
運命 Destiny
抗えぬ力 A Power That Cannot Be Defied
絶対絶命 Desperate Situation
強戦士、サイヤ人 The Formidable Warrior, the Saiyan
疾走バトル! Scampering Battle!
逆転挽回An Outcome Switching Recovery
Dragon Soul (Orchestra Version)
平穏な時間Tanquil Times
大魔王現るDaimao Appears
苦戦A Tough Struggle
驚愕!Shock!
広がりし戦雲The Clouds of War Spread
ドラゴンボール改～アイキャッチA～Dragon Ball Kai ~Eyecatch A~
Win Tough Fight! ~Guitar Version~
Over the Star ~Piano Version~
ドラゴンボール改～アイキャッチB～Dragon Ball Kai ~Eyecatch B~
予期せぬ事態Unforeseen Circumstances
戦いの幕開けThe Curtain Rises On the Battle
不安と焦燥Anxiety and Unease
大地を駆けるRunning Across the Land
KAME HOUSE
バブルス・ダンスBubbles' Dance
おののく瞬間A Moment for Shuddering
緊迫の荒野A Wasteland of Tension
レクイエム～死にゆくモノたちへ～Requiem ~To Those Who Meet Their End~
強者へ挑む勇士The Braveheart Challenges the Strong
強大な敵A Mighty Foe
Yeah! Break! Care! Break! (TVサイズ) Yeah! Break! Care! Break! (TV Size)
ドラゴンボール改～次回予告～Dragon Ball Kai ~Next Episode Preview~
集え!伝説の超戦士たち [BONUS TRACK]Assemble! The Legendary Super Warriors
冒険の始まり [BONUS TRACK]The Adventure Begins
最強の敵が現れた!!! [BONUS TRACK]The Strongest Enemy Has Appeared!!!

Dragon Ball Kai: Original Soundtrack 2 (2009)

Dragon Ball Kai: Original Soundtrack 2 was released in 2009.

Dragon Ball Kai: Soundtrack III & Songs (2010)

Dragon Ball Kai: Soundtrack III & Songs was released in 2010.

Dragon Ball Super: Original Soundtrack (2016)

Dragon Ball Super: Original Soundtrack was released in 2016.

Dragon Ball Super: Original Soundtrack Volume 2 (2018)

Dragon Ball Super: Original Soundtrack Volume 2 was released in 2018.

Movie soundtracks

Dragon Ball Z: Music Collection Vol. 1 (1992)

 is a compilation soundtrack album that features music of the first seven Dragon Ball Z films by composer Shunsuke Kikuchi. It was first released exclusively in Japan by Columbia Records on August 21, 1992 and again on September 22, 2004 as a part of the Animex 1200 series as its 61st instalment. This album is considered a must for DBZ collectors, as it contains the extended version of Chikyū Marugoto Chô-Kessen that features the music that played as Goku formed the Genki-Dama. As this would later become the de facto theme for the Genki-Dama, notable for its "Dun-Dun-Dun" styled beat.

It peaked at number 86 of the Japanese Albums Chart.

Track listing:
CHA-LA HEAD-CHA-LA (TV-size vocal version)
《組曲》ドラゴンボールZ《Kumikyoku》Doragon Bōru Zetto/(Musical Suite) Dragon Ball Z
《組曲》この世で一番強いヤツ《Kumikyoku》Kono Yo de Ichiban Tsuyoi Yatsu/(Musical Suite) The World's Strongest Guy
《組曲》地球まるごと超決戦《Kumikyoku》Chikyū Marugoto Chô-Kessen/(Musical Suite) Super Deciding Battle for the Entire Planet Earth
《組曲》超サイヤ人だ孫悟空《Kumikyoku》Sūpā Saiyajin da Son Gokū/(Musical Suite) Son Goku the Super Saiyan
CHA-LA HEAD-CHA-LA (full-size instrumental version)
《組曲》とびっきりの最強対最強《Kumikyoku》Tobikkiri no Saikyô tai Saikyô/(Musical Suite) The Incredible Mightiest vs. Mightiest
《組曲》激突!! 100億パワーの戦士たち《Kumikyoku》Gekitotsu!! 100-Oku Pawā no Senshi-tachi/(Musical Suite) Clash!! The 10,000,000,000 Powerful Warriors
《組曲》極限バトル!! 三大超サイヤ人《Kumikyoku》Kyokugen Batoru!! San Dai Sūpā Saiyajin/(Musical Suite) Extreme Battle!! The Three Great Super Saiyans
でてこい とびきりZENKAIパワー! (TV-size vocal version)Detekoi Tobikiri ZENKAI Pawā! (TV-size vocal version)/Come Out, Incredible ZENKAI Power! (TV-size vocal version)

Dragon Ball Z: Music Collection Vol. 2 (1993)

 is a soundtrack album that features the entire musical score of the eighth Dragon Ball Z film Moe Tsukiro!! Nessen, Retsusen, Chôgekisen (Broly: The Legendary Super Saiyan in the Funimation dub) by composer Shunsuke Kikuchi. It was released by Columbia Records exclusively in Japan first on May 1, 1993 and again on September 22, 2004 as a part of the Animex 1200 series as its 62nd installment.

Track listing:
CHA-LA HEAD-CHA-LA
伝説の超サイヤ人Densetsu no Sūpā Saiyajin/The Super Saiyan of Legend
新惑星ベジータShin Wakusei Bejīta/New Planet Vegeta
トランクス達の疑惑Torankusu-tachi no Giwaku/The Suspicions of Trunks and the Others
やって来た孫悟空Yattekita Son Gokū/Son Goku Has Arrived
重大な秘密Jūdai na Himitsu/An Important Secret
異常な興奮Ijô na Kôfun/Unusual Excitement
重く暗い過去Omoku Kurai Kako/A Seriously Dark Past
運命の激突!!Unmei no Gekitotsu/The Destined Clash
ブロリーの正体Burorī no Shôtai/True Nature of Broli
パラガスの野望Paragasu no Yabô/Scheme of Paragus
ブロリー変身!!Burorī Henshin!!/Broli's Transformation!!
狼狽するベジータRôbai Suru Bejīta/The Disconcerted Vegeta
復讐の時来る!!Fukushū no Toki Kuru!!/The Time for Revenge Comes!!
悪魔のブロリーAkuma no Burorī/Broli the Devil
膨れ上がる恐怖Fukureagaru Kyôfu/Swelling Fear
悲愴な闘いHisô na Tatakai/The Tragic Battle
野望の最期Yabô no Saigo/The Scheme's Final Moments
悟空!! 不屈の闘志Gokū!! Fukutsu no Tôshi/Goku!! The Indomitable Fighting Spirit
パワーをくれ!!Pawā o Kure!!/Lend Me Your Power!!
集合パワーの勝利!!Shūgô no Pawā no Shôri!!/The Gathered Power of Triumph!!
バーニング・ファイト-熱戦・烈戦・超激戦-Bāningu Faito—Nessen Ressen Chô Gekisen--/Burning Fight: A Close, Intense, Super-Fierce Battle

Dragon Ball Z: Kiken na Futari! Super Senshi wa Nemurenai Music Collection (1994)

 is the licensed soundtrack to the tenth Dragon Ball Z film by the same name (Known outside Japan as Broly Second Coming). It was released by Forte Music Entertainment on April 1, 1994 in Japan only. This contains the film's score by composer Shunsuke Kikuchi and opening and closing themes performed by Hironobu Kageyama.

Track listing:
眠れ﹑超戦士Nemure, Chô-Senshi/Sleep, Super-Warrior
オープニングテーマ~WE GOTTA POWERŌpuningu Tēma~WE GOTTA POWER/Opening Theme: WE GOTTA POWER
ドラゴンボールを追っかけろ！Doragon Bōru o Okkakero!/Chase After the Dragon Ball!
二星球は卵と一緒Arushinchū wa Tamago to Issho/The Two-Star Ball is Among Eggs
ヤンチャ三人組といけにえの少女Yancha San'ningumi to Ikenie no Shôjo/The Mischievous Trio and the Scapegoat Young Girl
長老は語るChôrô wa Kataru/The Elder is Speaking
超戦士の目覚めChô-Senshi no Mezame/Awakening of The Super-Warrior
恐竜さんをやっつけろKyôryū-san o Yattsukero/Defeat Mr. Dinosaur
ビーデルSOSブロリーと遭遇！Bīderu SOS Burorī to Sôgū!/Videl's SOS: an Encounter with Broli!
四星球奪回作戦Sūshinchū Dakkai Sakusen/Tactics for Recapturing the Four-Star Ball
どこ﹑どこ？四星球Doko, Doko? Sūshinchū/Where, Where? The Four-Star Ball
神龍が出て来ない！？Shenron ga Detekonai!?/Shenlong's Not Coming Out!?
ブロリー猛襲！！Burorī Môshū!!/Broli's Furious Attack!!
復讐のブロリーFukushū no Burorī/The Avenging Broly
闘え！悟飯！！Tatakae! Gohan!!/Fight! Gohan!!
終末の始まりShūmatsu no Hajimari/The Beginning of the End
悪魔への変身Akuma e no Henshin/Transformation of a Demon
負けるな悟飯！！Makeru Na Gohan!!/Don't Lose, Gohan!!
ピッコロ登場！？Pikkoro Tôjô!?/Piccolo Appears!?
悪魔は死なないAkuma wa Shinanai/The Demon Doesn't Die
ドラゴンボールの秘密Doragon Bōru no Himitsu/Secret of the Dragon Balls
奇蹟を呼び起こせ！！～現れた孫悟空Kiseki o Yobiokose!!~Arawareta Son Gokū/Awaken the Miracle!!: Son Goku Appears
悟空親子の勝利Gokū Oyako no Shôri/Victory of Goku and His Sons
世界は平和ねSekai wa Heiwa ne/The World's at Peace, Isn't It?
エンディングテーマ~奇蹟のビッグ・ファイトEndingu Tēma~Kiseki no Biggu Faito/Ending Theme: The Miraculous Big Fight

Dragon Ball Z: Super Senshi Gekiha!! Katsu no wa Ore Da Music Collection (1994)

 is the licensed soundtrack to the eleventh Dragon Ball Z film by the same name (Known outside Japan as Bio-Broly). It was released by Forte Music Entertainment on April 1, 1994 in Japan only. This contains the film's score by composer Shunsuke Kikuchi and opening and closing themes performed by Hironobu Kageyama.

Track listing:
The Baron Jagar Badda's Scheme 
Opening Theme; WE GOTTA POWER (Hironobu Kageyama) 
There's Nice Weather Today, Too
A Challenge From an Old Friend
Well, Let's Get Out There and Make Our Hearts Jump
The Bio Warriors' Theme
And That Name is Baron Jagar Badda
Revenge is Stimulating
A Ring is My Stage
A Crucial Confrontation! The Bio Army 
The Small Super-Heroes 
Is That Brolli!? 
The Demon, For the Third Time 
I'm the One Who'll Win!! 
You're Looking Good, Kuririn 
A Feast of Terror 
The Crisis Doesn't Stop  
Apparent Victory 
We Did It! The Strategy's Success
Brolli's Dying Moments
Brolli's Greatest Terror 
A Menace that Covers the Earth 
Hope isn't Lost 
The Fearsome Last Power
Feeling Thrilled 
Ending Theme; Dragon Power Infinity (Hironobu Kageyama)

Dragon Ball: Saikyō e no Michi Original Soundtrack (1996)

 is the official licensed soundtrack of 10th anniversary Dragon Ball movie by the same name (The Path to Power in Funimation dub.). It was released by Columbia Records on March 23, 1996 in Japan only. This album contains tracks from the film that also played in Dragon Ball GT due to that the shows composer Akihito Tokunaga worked on the film as well. Because the GT series never received its own soundtrack release, this CD is the only official release of the music from GT. The album also includes the original TV-size recording of the opening theme song from GT, "Dan Dan Kokoro Hikareteku" by the band Field of View.

Track listing:
序章～パオズ山～Joshō~Paozu Yama~/Prologue: Mount Pao-tzu
ビックリ遭遇！～悟空とブルマ～IBikkuri Sōgū!!~Gokū to Buruma~I/A Surprise Encounter!!: Goku and Bulma I
「女の子」にはシッポがない！？～悟空とブルマ～II"On'na no Ko" ni wa Shippo ga Nai!?~Gokū to Buruma II/"Girls" Don't Have Tails!?: Goku and Bulma II
bridge①～じっちゃんがふえちゃった！？～Burijji ①~Jit-chan ga Fuechatta!?/Bridge ①: Grandpa Multiplied!?
ドラゴンボールの秘密～神龍～Doragon Bōru no Himitsu~Shenron~/The Secret of theDragon Balls: Shenlong
出発！ドラゴンボールへの旅～悟空とブルマ～IIIShuppatsu!! Doragon Bōru e no Tabi~Gokū to Buruma III~/Setting Out!! The Journey toward the Dragon Balls: Goku and Bulma III 
bridge②～レッドリボン軍総本部～Burijji ②~Reddo Ribon Gun Sôhonbu~/Bridge 2: Red Ribbon Army Headquarters
ウーロンのテーマ～巨大ロボに変身～Ūron no Tēma~Kyodai Robo ni Henshin~/Theme of Oolong: Transformation into a Giant Robot
ウーロンのテーマ～時間切れ！ウーロンの変身は5分間～Ūron no Tēma~Jikan Kire! Ūron no Henka wa 5 Bunkan~/Theme of Oolong: Time Limit!! Oolong's Transformations are for 5 Minutes
エッチなウーロン～夢はパフパフ...～Etchi na Ūron~Yume wa Pafu-Pafu...~/The Perverted Oolong: His Dream is a Puff-Puff...
危機!! 荒野の大泥棒ヤムチャ来襲Kiki!! Kôya no Dai-Dorobō Yamucha Raishū/Crisis!! Yamcha, the Great Bandit of the Wild Attacks
強敵ヤムチャ～狼牙風風拳～Kyōteki Yamucha/The Formidable Foe, Yamcha
ヤムチャ退敵！？ブルマにドッキリふらふらYamucha Taisan!? Buruma ni Dokkiri Fura-Fura/Yamcha Cracks!? Sent into a Shocked Swoon by Bulma
bridge③～発見！一星球～Burijji ③~Hakken!! Īshinchū~/Bridge 3: Discovery!! The Yi Xing Qiu
レッドリボン軍のテーマ～マッスルタワーのホワイト将軍～Reddo Ribon Gun no Tēma/The Red Ribbon Army's Theme
快進撃！悟空Kaishingeki!! Gokū/A Sweeping Charge!! Goku
対決!! メタリック軍曹Taiketsu!! Metarikku Gunsō/Confrontation!! Sergeant Metallic
ハッチャンのテーマI～人造人間8号登場～Hat-chan no Tēma 1~Jinzôningen Hachi-gō Tōjō~/Theme of 8-chan 1: Artificial Human #8 Comes on Stage
ハッチャンのテーマII～人造人間8号優しい勇気と覚悟～Hat-chan no Tēma 2~Jinzōningen Hachi-gō no Yasashii Yūki to Kakugo~/Theme of 8-chan 2: Artificial Human #8's Gentle Courage and Determination
ハッチャンと悟空の出会いHat-chan to Gokū no Deai/The Meeting of 8-chan and Goku
ハッチャンのテーマIII～今日からともたち～Hat-chan no Tēma 3~Kyō Kara Tomodachi~/Theme of 8-chan 3: Friends From This Day on
bridge④～海ガメの思返しは果たして！？～Burijji ④~Umigame no Ongaeshi wa Hatashite!?~/Bridge ④: Is the Sea Turtle's Repayment for Real!?
海辺の夜明けUmibe no Yoake/Dawn on the Beach
bridge⑤～海辺の朝～Burijji ⑤~Umibe no Asa~/Bridge ⑤: Morning on the Beach
亀仙人のテーマKame-Sen'nin no Tēma/Theme of Kame-Sen'nin
筋斗雲Kinto-Un
悟空﹑筋斗雲に乗る!!br>Gokū, Kinto-Un ni Noru!!/Goku, Riding on Kinto-Un!!
お色気ブルマにドッキドキ!! 亀仙人O-iroke Buruma ni Dokki-Doki!! Kame-Sen'nin/Put into Palpitations by the Sexy Bulma!! Kame-Sen'nin
レッドリボン軍のテーマ～総攻撃！ブルー将軍～Reddo Ribon Gun no Tēma ～  Sōkōgeki!! Burū Shōgun/Theme of The Red Ribbon Army ～ All-Out Offensive!! General Blue
本家本元！武天老師のかめはめ波！Honkehonmoto! Muten Rôshi/The Original! Muten Rôshi's Kamehameha
誕生！悟空のかめはめ波Tanjou! Gokuu no Kamehameha/Birth! Goku's Kamehameha
ブルマのロマンス～あこがれのヤムチャ様...！？～Buruma no Romansu~Akogare no Yamucha-sama...!?/Bulma's Romance: The Yearned-After Lord Yamcha...!?
荒れ果てた戦場Arehate 'ta Senjô/The Desolate Battlefield
大空にバトル！悟空VSバイオレット大佐Ōzora no Batoru! Gokū VS Baioretto Taisa/Battle in the Sky! Goku vs. Colonel Violet
レッドリボン軍のテーマ～飛行船の追撃～Reddo Ribon Gun no Tēma~Hikôtei no Tsuigeki~/Theme of The Red Ribbon Army: Seaplane Pursuit
レッドリボン軍～総本部大決戦～Reddo Ribon Gun no Tēma~Sōhonbu Dai-Kessen~/Theme of The Red Ribbon Army: Headquarters' Great Deciding Battle
レッド総帥の最期～ブラックの野望～Reddo Sōsui no Saigo~Burakku no Yabô~/Final Moments of Commander Red:The Plot of Black
巨大ロボット出現!!Kyodai Robotto Shutsugen!!/A Giant Robot Appears!!
最後の総帥・ブラックの反乱Saigo no Sōsui-Burakku no Hanran/The Last Commander: The Rebellion of Black
最大のピンチ悟空！ハッチャン登場Saidai no Pinchi Gokū! Hat-chan Tōjō/Goku in His Greatest Pinch! 8-chan Shows Up
ハッチャンのテーマIV～ブラックVSハッチャン～Hat-chan no Tēma IV~Burakku VS Hat-chan~/Theme of 8-chan IV: Black vs. 8-chan
ハッチャン～悟空との想い出　そして永遠の眠りへ～Hat-chan~Gokū to no Omoide Soshite Eien no Nemuri e~/8-chan: Memories of Goku, and then Eternal Sleep
悲しみと怒りのオーラKanashimi to Ikari no Ōra/An Aura of Sadness and Anger
グランド・フィナーレ～神秘の力～Gurando Fināre~Shinpi no Chikara~/The Grand Finale: Mysterious Power
DAN　DAN　心魅かれてく（CINEMA　VERSION）DAN DAN Kokoro Hikarete 'ku (Cinema Version)/Gradually, You're Charming My Heart (Cinema Version)

Dragonball Evolution: Original Motion Picture Soundtrack (2009)

Dragon Ball Z: Battle of Gods Original Soundtrack (2013)

Dragon Ball Z: Battle of Gods Original Soundtrack was released in 2013.

Dragon Ball Z: Fukkatsu no "F" Original Soundtrack (2015)

Dragon Ball Z: Fukkatsu no "F" Original Soundtrack was released in 2015.

Video game soundtracks

Dragon Ball Z Game Music series

Dragon Ball Final Bout: Original Soundtrack (1997)

Dragon Ball Z & Z 2 Original Soundtrack (Budokai 1 & 2) (2005)

Dragon Ball Z 3 Original Soundtrack (Budokai 3) (2005)

Super Survivor (2008)

Super Survivor is a licensed release by Hironobu Kageyama. It was released on July 28, 2008 in Japan only. It ranked 188 on Oricon's charts.  Originally it was planned to be released on April 9 but it was pushed back for unknown reasons. This album includes the theme songs from Dragon Ball Z video games Sparking Meteor (known outside Japan as Budokai Tenkaichi 3) and Burst Limit, "Super Survivor" and "Kiseki no Honō yo Moeagare!" respectively. This also features both the original Japanese and English versions which are retitled as "Finish'em Off" and "Fight It Out".

Track listing:
序章～パオズ山～Joshō~Paozu Yama~/Prologue: Mount Pao-tzu
ビックリ遭遇！～悟空とブルマ～IBikkuri Sōgū!!~Gokū to Buruma~I/A Surprise Encounter!!: Goku and Bulma I
「女の子」にはシッポがない！？～悟空とブルマ～II"On'na no Ko" ni wa Shippo ga Nai!?~Gokū to Buruma II/"Girls" Don't Have Tails!?: Goku and Bulma II
bridge①～じっちゃんがふえちゃった！？～Burijji ①~Jit-chan ga Fuechatta!?/Bridge ①: Grandpa Multiplied!?
ドラゴンボールの秘密～神龍～Doragon Bōru no Himitsu~Shenron~/The Secret of the Dragon Balls: Shenlong
出発！ドラゴンボールへの旅～悟空とブルマ～IIIShuppatsu!! Doragon Bōru e no Tabi~Gokū to Buruma III~/Setting Out!! The Journey toward the Dragon Balls: Goku and Bulma III 
bridge②～レッドリボン軍総本部～Burijji ②~Reddo Ribon Gun Sôhonbu~/Bridge 2: Red Ribbon Army Headquarters
ウーロンのテーマ～巨大ロボに変身～Ūron no Tēma~Kyodai Robo ni Henshin~/Theme of Oolong: Transformation into a Giant Robot
ウーロンのテーマ～時間切れ！ウーロンの変身は5分間～Ūron no Tēma~Jikan Kire! Ūron no Henka wa 5 Bunkan~/Theme of Oolong: Time Limit!! Oolong's Transformations are for 5 Minutes
エッチなウーロン～夢はパフパフ...～Etchi na Ūron~Yume wa Pafu-Pafu...~/The Perverted Oolong: His Dream is a Puff-Puff...
危機!! 荒野の大泥棒ヤムチャ来襲Kiki!! Kôya no Dai-Dorobō Yamucha Raishū/Crisis!! Yamcha, the Great Bandit of the Wild Attacks
強敵ヤムチャ～狼牙風風拳～Kyōteki Yamucha/The Formidable Foe, Yamcha
ヤムチャ退敵！？ブルマにドッキリふらふらYamucha Taisan!? Buruma ni Dokkiri Fura-Fura/Yamcha Cracks!? Sent into a Shocked Swoon by Bulma
bridge③～発見！一星球～Burijji ③~Hakken!! Īshinchū~/Bridge 3: Discovery!! The Yi Xing Qiu
レッドリボン軍のテーマ～マッスルタワーのホワイト将軍～Reddo Ribon Gun no Tēma/The Red Ribbon Army's Theme
快進撃！悟空Kaishingeki!! Gokū/A Sweeping Charge!! Goku
対決!! メタリック軍曹Taiketsu!! Metarikku Gunsō/Confrontation!! Sergeant Metallic
ハッチャンのテーマI～人造人間8号登場～Hat-chan no Tēma 1~Jinzôningen Hachi-gō Tōjō~/Theme of 8-chan 1: Artificial Human #8 Comes on Stage
ハッチャンのテーマII～人造人間8号優しい勇気と覚悟～Hat-chan no Tēma 2~Jinzōningen Hachi-gō no Yasashii Yūki to Kakugo~/Theme of 8-chan 2: Artificial Human #8's Gentle Courage and Determination
ハッチャンと悟空の出会いHat-chan to Gokū no Deai/The Meeting of 8-chan and Goku
ハッチャンのテーマIII～今日からともたち～Hat-chan no Tēma 3~Kyō Kara Tomodachi~/Theme of 8-chan 3: Friends From This Day on
bridge④～海ガメの思返しは果たして！？～Burijji ④~Umigame no Ongaeshi wa Hatashite!?~/Bridge ④: Is the Sea Turtle's Repayment for Real!?
海辺の夜明けUmibe no Yoake/Dawn on the Beach
bridge⑤～海辺の朝～Burijji ⑤~Umibe no Asa~/Bridge ⑤: Morning on the Beach
亀仙人のテーマKame-Sen'nin no Tēma/Theme of Kame-Sen'nin
筋斗雲Kinto-Un
悟空﹑筋斗雲に乗る!!br>Gokū, Kinto-Un ni Noru!!/Goku, Riding on Kinto-Un!!
お色気ブルマにドッキドキ!! 亀仙人O-iroke Buruma ni Dokki-Doki!! Kame-Sen'nin/Put into Palpitations by the Sexy Bulma!! Kame-Sen'nin
レッドリボン軍のテーマ～総攻撃！ブルー将軍～Reddo Ribon Gun no Tēma ～  Sōkōgeki!! Burū Shōgun/Theme of The Red Ribbon Army ～ All-Out Offensive!! General Blue
本家本元！武天老師のかめはめ波！Honkehonmoto! Muten Rôshi/The Original! Muten Rôshi's Kamehameha
誕生！悟空のかめはめ波Tanjou! Gokuu no Kamehameha/Birth! Goku's Kamehameha
ブルマのロマンス～あこがれのヤムチャ様...！？～Buruma no Romansu~Akogare no Yamucha-sama...!?/Bulma's Romance: The Yearned-After Lord Yamcha...!?
荒れ果てた戦場Arehate 'ta Senjô/The Desolate Battlefield
大空にバトル！悟空VSバイオレット大佐Ōzora no Batoru! Gokū VS Baioretto Taisa/Battle in the Sky! Goku vs. Colonel Violet
レッドリボン軍のテーマ～飛行船の追撃～Reddo Ribon Gun no Tēma~Hikôtei no Tsuigeki~/Theme of The Red Ribbon Army: Seaplane Pursuit
レッドリボン軍～総本部大決戦～Reddo Ribon Gun no Tēma~Sōhonbu Dai-Kessen~/Theme of The Red Ribbon Army: Headquarters' Great Deciding Battle
レッド総帥の最期～ブラックの野望～Reddo Sōsui no Saigo~Burakku no Yabô~/Final Moments of Commander Red:The Plot of Black
巨大ロボット出現!!Kyodai Robotto Shutsugen!!/A Giant Robot Appears!!
最後の総帥・ブラックの反乱Saigo no Sōsui-Burakku no Hanran/The Last Commander: The Rebellion of Black
最大のピンチ悟空！ハッチャン登場Saidai no Pinchi Gokū! Hat-chan Tōjō/Goku in His Greatest Pinch! 8-chan Shows Up
ハッチャンのテーマIV～ブラックVSハッチャン～Hat-chan no Tēma IV~Burakku VS Hat-chan~/Theme of 8-chan IV: Black vs. 8-chan
ハッチャン～悟空との想い出　そして永遠の眠りへ～Hat-chan~Gokū to no Omoide Soshite Eien no Nemuri e~/8-chan: Memories of Goku, and then Eternal Sleep
悲しみと怒りのオーラKanashimi to Ikari no Ōra/An Aura of Sadness and Anger
グランド・フィナーレ～神秘の力～Gurando Fināre~Shinpi no Chikara~/The Grand Finale: Mysterious Power
DAN　DAN　心魅かれてく（CINEMA　VERSION）DAN DAN Kokoro Hikarete 'ku (Cinema Version)/Gradually, You're Charming My Heart (Cinema Version)

Dragon Ball Z: Burst Limit Original Soundtrack (2008)

Dragon Ball Z: Infinite World Original Soundtrack (2009)

Dragon Ball: Raging Blast Collector's Edition Soundtrack (2009)

Dragon Ball: Raging Blast 2 Original Soundtrack Overseas Version (2011)

Dragon Ball: Xenoverse & Xenoverse 2

Compilation albums

Dragon Ball Z: Bukkun

 is a collection of songs from the anime Dragon Ball Z. It was released by Columbia Records on August 8, 1991 in Japan only.

Track listing:
CHA-LA HEAD-CHA-LA
天下一ゴハンTenkaichi Gohan/The World's Greatest Gohan
ピッコロさんだ～いすき♡Pikkoro-san Da~isuki ♡/I Lo~ve Mr. Piccolo ♡
戦（I・KU・SA）Ikusa (I•KU•SA)/Battle
まるごとMarugoto/The Whole World
口笛の気持ちKuchibue no Kimochi/The Feeling of Whistling
「ヤ」なことには元気玉！！"Ya" na Koto ni wa Genki-Dama!!/There's a Genki-Dama in Bad Things!!
ソリッドステート・スカウターSoriddo Sutēto Sukautā/Solid State Scouter
光の旅Hikari no Tabi/Journey of Light
お達者ポルカO-tassha Poruka/The Healthy Polka
アサ・ヒル・ヨル・キミ・ボクAsu • Hiru • Yoru • Kimi • Boku/Morning, Daytime, Night, You, Me
シャレれば命の泉わくわく！！Share 'reba Inochi no Izumi Waku-Waku!!/If I Tell a Joke, It's an Exciting Fountain of Life!!
摩訶不思議アドベンチャー！Makafushigi Adobenchā!/Mystical Adventure!
でてこい　とびきりZENKAIパワー！Detekoi Tobikiri ZENKAI Pawā!/Come Out, Incredible ZENKAI Power!

Digital Dragon Ball The World (1994)

 is a compilation soundtrack released by Columbia Records on April 1, 1994 in Japan only. Each track on this album contains synthesized medleys of various theme and insert songs from both series.

Track listing:
序曲～探せ！ドラゴンボール(使用曲：魔訶不思議アドベンチャー！)Sagase! Doragon Bōru (Makafushigi Adobenchâ!)/Search For Them! Dragon Balls (Mystical Adventure!)
仲間との出会い～修業の日々(使用曲：武天老師の教え/ロマンティックあげるよ/ウルフハリケーン)Nakama to no Deai ~ Shugyô no Hibi (Muten Rôshi no Oshie; Romantikku Ageru Yo; Urufu Harikēn) /Meeting Friends ~ Days of Training (The Teachings of Muten Roshi; I'll Give You a Romantic Night; Wolf Hurricane)
天下一武道会への挑戦(使用曲：めざせ天下一)Tenka-ichi Budôkai e no Chôsen (Mezase Tenka-ichi)/Challenge to the Tenka-ichi Budôkai (Aim to Be the Greatest on Earth)
レッド･リボン軍･ピッコロ大魔王VS悟空(使用曲：レッド･リボン･アーミー/風を感じて)Reddo Ribon Gun ~ Pikkoro Daimaô vs Gokû (Reddo Ribon Âmî; Kaze o Kanjite)/The Red Ribbon Army ~ Demon King Piccolo vs. Goku (Red Ribbon Army; Feel the Wind)
ドラゴンボール伝説(使用曲：ドラゴンボール伝説)Doragon Bōru Densetsu/Dragon Ball Legend
孫悟飯登場(使用曲：CHA-LA HEAD-CHA-LA/口笛の気持ち/でてこいとびきり Zenkai パワー！)Son Gohan Tôjô (CHA-LA HEAD-CHA-LA; Kuchibue no Kimochi; Detekoi Tobikiri ZENKAI Pawā!)/Son Gohan Appears (Cha-La Head-Cha-La; The Feeling of Whistling; Come Out, Incredible ZENKAI Power!)
終りなき戦いの日々(使用曲：燃えろ！ドラゴン･ソルジャーズ/戦〈I･KU･SA〉/まるごと/とびっきりの最強対最強/Hiro〈キミがヒーロー〉/銀河を超えてライジング･ハイ)Owarinaki Tatakai no Hibi (Moero! Doragon Sorujāzu; Ikusa [I•KU•SA]; Marugoto; Tobikkiri no Saikyô tai Saikyô; HERO [Kimi ga Hîrô]; Ginga o Koete Raijingu Hai)/Days of Endless Battle (Burn, Dragon Soldiers!; The Battle; The Whole World; The Incredible Mightiest vs. Mightiest; Hero [You're the Hero]; Surpassing the Galaxy, Rising High)
死闘！セルゲームShitô! Seru Gēmu/Life-and-Death Struggle! Cell Games
ドラゴーンボールよ永遠に(使用曲：光の旅/青い風のHOPE)Doragon Bōru Yo Eien ni (Hikari no Tabi / Aoi Kaze no HOPE)/The Dragon Balls, Eternally! (Light's Journey of light / Blue Wind of Hope)
フィナーレ：物語は続くよ，どこまでも(使用曲：ウィ･ガッタ･パワー/僕達は天使だった)Monogatari wa Tsuzuku Yo, Doko Made mo (WE GOTTA POWER; Boku-tachi wa Tenshi Datta)/The Story Continues, No Matter Where It Goes! (WE GOTTA POWER; We Use To Be Angels)

Bigbox Dragon Ball Z (1994)

Dragon Ball Z: The Best Selections (1995)

 is a compilation soundtrack released April 21, 1995 in Japan only. This album not only includes the standard theme songs, but it includes songs that were bonus tracks to the movie theme song singles, and from Music Fantasy.

Track listing:
WE GOTTA POWER
僕達は天使だったBokutachi wa Tenshi Datta/We Used to be Angels
CHA-LA HEAD-CHA-LA
でてこいとびきりZENKAIパワー！Detekoi Tobikiri ZENKAI Pawā!/Come Out Incredible ZENKAI Power!
最強のフュージョンSaikya no Fyūjon/Strongest of Fusion
愛はバラードのように～ベジータのテーマ～Ai wa Barā do no Yoni~BEJĪTA no Tēma~/Love is Like a Ballad: Theme of Vegeta
ドラゴンパワー∞Doragon Pawā Mugendai/Dragon Power Infinity
小さな戦士～悟天とトランクスのテーマ～Chīsa na Senshi~Goten to Torankusu no Tēma~/The Young Warriors: Theme of Goten and Trunks
カンフー体操Kanfū Taiso/Kung-Fu Gymnastics
奇跡のビッグ・ファイトKiseki no Biggu Faito/Big Fight of Miracle
ドラゴンボール伝説Doragonbōru no Densetsu/Legend of the Dragon Ball
MONDAIないさ!!MONDAI Naisa!!/No Problem!

Dragon Ball Z: Music Fantasy (1995)

 is an image soundtrack released by Forte Music Entertainment on January 21, 1995 in Japan only. This album features synthesized music. Like Digital Dragon Ball, it contains medleys of the opening and closing theme songs from both 'Dragon Ball and Dragon Ball Z. However, it also contains three exclusive vocal tracks.

Track listing:
オーバーチュアŌbāchua/Overture
Z戦士テーマZ Senshi/ Z Warrior
MONDAIないさ！！MONDAI Nasai/No Problem
主題歌メドレー～カンフーバトル～Shudaika Medorē ~Kanfu Batoru~/Shudaika Melody ~Kung Fu Battle~
仲間達Nakamatachi/Colleagues
你好大好きNīhao Daisuki
地獄の叫びJigoku no Sakebi/Yell of Hell
暗黒の帝王Ankoku no Teiō
キミがいる地球に来たよKimi Gairuchikyu ni Kitayo
クロージングメドレーKurōjingu Medorē/Closing Melody

Dragon'98 Special Live (1998)

Dragon'98 Special Live is an album of a live concert featuring a few of the solo artist who contributed song for Dragon Ball Z which was held at Shibuya in 1998. It was released by Pony Canyon on December 18, 1998 in Japan only. The album was re-released by Sony Music Entertainment on September 9, 2008. All the artist are collected as Monolith on the album's credits.

Track listing:
MIND POWER･･･気･･･Mind Power...Ki.../Mind Power...Energy...
WHITE & WORLD & TRUE...白と世界と心...White & World & True...Shiro to Sekai to Kokoro.../White, the World, and the Heart
WARNING OF DANGER･･･警告･･･Warning of Danger...Keikoku.../Warning of Danger...Warning...
運命の日～魂VS魂～Unmei no Hi ~Tamashii VS Tamashii/Day of Destiny: Spirit vs. Spirit
黄金のコンパスŌgon no Konpasu/Compass of Gold
アクアリウムの夜Akuariumu no Yoru/Aquarium of Night
FOR EVER～
光のWILL POWERHikari no Will Power/Willpower of Light 
Cool Cool ダンディCool Cool Dandi/Cool Cool Dandy 
Brain Dance
Cha-La Head-Cha-La 1.
1. Track 11 is listed as CHA-LA HEAD-CHA-LA, but it's in fact the Jungle Fever remix.

Dragon Ball Z: Best Remix 2006  Special (2006)

 is a remix compilation album of theme and image songs from Dragon Ball Z. It was released on December 20, 2006 by Columbia Records in Japan only.

Track listing:
CHA-LA HEAD-CHA-LA
でてこい とびきりZENKAIパワー!Detekoi Tobikiri ZENKAI Pawā!/Come Out, Incredible ZENKAI Power!
永遠の地球Eien no Chikyū/Earth of Eternity
戦(I・KU・SA)Ikusa/Battle
光の旅Hikari no Tabi/Journey of Light
WHITE & WORLD & TRUE・・・白と世界と心WHITE & WORLD & TRUE...Shiro to Sekai to Kokoro.../White, the World, and the Heart
HERO (キミがヒーロー)HERO (Kimi ga Hīrō) /Hero (You're the Hero)
黄金のコンパスÔgon no Konpasu/Compass of Gold
Cool Cool ダンディCool Cool Dandi/Cool Cool Dandy
バーニング・ファイト-熱戦・烈戦・超激戦-Bāningu Faito—Nessen • Ressen • Chô-Gekisen--/Burning Fight: A Close, Intense, Super-Fierce Battle
マザー・ユニバースMazā Yunibāsu/Mother Universe
WE GOTTA POWER
僕達は天使だったBoku-tachi wa Tenshi datta/We Use To Be Angels
君の空へKimi no Sora e/To Your Sky

Koro-chan Pack Dragon Ball Best (2007)

 is a collection of songs released by Columbia Records on September 19, 2007 in Japan only. The album is essentially a part of an ongoing series of albums called the Koro-chan Pack. The album includes the series opening and closing theme songs, three character songs, and the closing theme to the film "Makafushigi Dai-Bōken" (Known outside Japan as Mystical Adventure). Aside from Amazon.com, the album has made appearances on domestic retailer like Target's online store under the name Colo-chan Pack Dragon Ball Best.

Track listing:
魔訶不思議アドヴェンチャー!Makafushigi Adobenchâ!/Mystical Adventure!
孫悟空ソングSon Gokū Songu/Son Goku Song
武天老師の教えMuten Rôshi no Oshie/Teachings of Muten Roshi
ドラゴンボール伝説Doragon Bōru Densetsu/Dragon Ball Legend
ウルフ・ハリケーンUrufu Harikēn/Wolf Hurricane
ロマンティックあげるよRomantikku Ageru yo/I'll Give You a Romantic Night

Koro-chan Pack Dragon Ball Z Best (2007)

 is a collection of songs from Dragon Ball Z. It was released by Columbia Records on September 19, 2007 in Japan only. The album is essentially a part of an ongoing series of albums called the Koro-chan Pack. The album includes first and second opening and closing theme songs, the closing theme song to TV special Hitori no Saishū Kessen ～Furīza ni Idonda Zetto Senshi Son Gokū no Chichi～ (Known outside Japan as Bardock: The Father of Goku), and the closing theme to the film Gekitotsu!! 100-Oku Pawā no Senshi-tachi (Known outside Japan as Return of Cooler).

Track listing:
"Cha-La Head-Cha-La"

"We Gotta Power"

Koro-chan Pack Dragon Ball Kai: Goku vs Vegeta (2010)

Koro-chan Pack Dragon Ball Kai: Goku vs Ginyu Special Task Force (2010)

Koro-chan Pack Dragon Ball Kai: Goku vs Freeza (2010)

Dragon Ball Z 20th Century: Songs Best (2013)

Works with Dragon Ball music

Akira Toriyama: The World (1990)
 is an image soundtrack featuring music from three anime film adaptations of works by Akira Toriyama: Dragon Ball Z: Chikyū Marugoto Chōkessen, Pink: Water Bandit, Rain Bandit and Kennosuke-sama. It was released by Columbia Records on July 7, 1990. Tracks 2-4 would go on to be included in Dragon Ball Z Complete Song Collection 4: Promise of Eternity.

Jump Original CD (Dragon Ball #1) (1993)

Jump Original CD (Dragon Ball #2) (1994)

Hironobu Kageyama Best Album 3: Mixture (1996)
 is a compilation album by Animesongs artist Hironobu Kageyama. It was released on April 20, 1996 in Japan only. This album is very sought after by fans for its inclusion of English versions of "Cha-La Head-Cha-La", "We Gotta Power", and "Boku-tachi ha Tenshi datta".

References

Soundtracks
 
Film and television discographies
Lists of soundtracks